Llyn Glangors is a lake in the Gwydir Forest in north Wales. An artificial reservoir, it was created to supply water for the nearby Pandora lead mine.

Sarn Helen, the Roman road, is thought to have passed close to the lake.

References
The Lakes of Eryri, by Geraint Roberts, Gwasg Carreg Gwalch, 1985

Trefriw
Glangors
Glangors